Kristina "Kiki" Mladenovic (born 14 May 1993) is a French professional tennis player and a former world No. 1 in doubles.

She is a nine-time Grand Slam champion, having won the 2016 and 2022 French Open women's doubles titles partnering Caroline Garcia, and the 2018 Australian Open, 2019 and 2020 French Opens and 2020 Australian Open with Tímea Babos. In mixed doubles, Mladenovic won the 2013 Wimbledon Championships and 2014 Australian Open alongside Daniel Nestor, and the 2022 Australian Open with Ivan Dodig. She has also reached a further six Grand Slam finals across women's and mixed doubles. Mladenovic became world No. 1 in doubles for the first time in June 2019, and has held the top ranking for a total of 12 weeks. She has won 28 career doubles titles, including the 2018 and 2019 WTA Finals and four at WTA 1000 level.

Mladenovic has also enjoyed success in singles, and reached her career-high ranking of world No. 10 in October 2017. She has won one WTA Tour singles title, at the 2017 St. Petersburg Trophy, and finished runner-up on seven occasions. Her best Grand Slam performance was reaching the quarterfinals at the 2015 US Open and the 2017 French Open. 

Mladenovic has represented France in the Fed Cup and Billie Jean King Cup since 2012, and was part of the team which won the competition in 2019. She has also competed at the Olympic Games on three occasions.

Personal life
Kristina Mladenovic was born in Saint-Pol-sur-Mer, in the Nord department of France. Her father is Dragan Mladenović, a former Yugoslav handball player of Kosovo Serb origin, and her mother Dženita Helić is a Serbian former volleyball player of Bosniak origin. They moved to France in 1992 when Dragan was signed by Dunkerque HGL. All became French citizens. Mladenovic has a brother named Luka. She dated Austrian tennis player Dominic Thiem from the middle of 2017 until the couple split up in November 2019.

Tennis career

2006–2011: No. 1 junior ranking and early professional career
Mladenovic started playing juniors in May 2006. In 2007, she became the European Under-14 singles champion. Her biggest junior achievement was at the 2009 French Open girls' singles, where she beat Daria Gavrilova of Russia in two sets in the final. Her highest junior ranking was No. 1, on 8 June 2009. She advanced to both the girls' singles and doubles finals at the 2009 Wimbledon Championships, losing to Noppawan Lertcheewakarn in the singles. In doubles, with partner Silvia Njirić, lost also to Lertcheewakarn, who partnered with Sally Peers.

Mladenovic began playing on the ITF Women's Circuit in September 2007. On the WTA Tour, she tried to qualify for Open Gaz de France but lost her first match to Petra Kvitová.

Mladenovic turned professional in 2009, making her Grand Slam debut at that year's Australian Open. At the Australian Open, she received a wildcard, but was defeated by No. 14 seed Patty Schnyder. In July, she qualified for the Prague Open but lost in the first round to Zarina Diyas of Kazakhstan.

At the Internationaux de Strasbourg, Mladenovic won her first match on the WTA Tour, coming back from 2–5 in the final set to win the tiebreak against Stefanie Vögele.

Mladenovic played for France at the 2011 Hopman Cup, partnering with Nicolas Mahut. France was drawn in the same group as the United States, Great Britain, and Italy. Mladenovic beat Francesca Schiavone and Laura Robson while losing to Bethanie Mattek-Sands in the singles matches. In the mixed doubles, she and Mahut won one of their three matches.

In 2011, she won her first Senior title at a $25k tournament in Sutton, defeating Mona Barthel. This was followed by a win in Stockholm the following week, defeating Arantxa Rus in the final.

2012: Breakthrough
At the start of the year, Mladenovic linked up with Biljana Veselinovic but they split just before Wimbledon and since then she had been coached by Thierry Ascione.
She claimed her first WTA Tour title of any type in Montreal when she and Klaudia Jans-Ignacik won the doubles title at the Rogers Cup. Mladenovic made it through to the third round of the US Open by defeating Pavlyuchenkova. At the Bell Classic in Québec, she reached her first WTA semifinal. With Tatjana Malek, Mladenovic won her second WTA Tour doubles title at the Bell Classic. Following her run to the semifinals, she entered the top 100 in the rankings for the first time. Mladenovic won the first ever WTA 125 event, the Taipei Ladies Open, and took the doubles crown as well.

2013: First Grand Slam mixed doubles title

At the Open GdF Suez, a Premier tournament, Mladenovic made the semifinals, including defeating Petra Kvitová. Teaming with Daniel Nestor, she made it to the final of the French Open in mixed doubles where they were defeated. However, she and Nestor rebounded at the mixed doubles at Wimbledon, capturing her first Grand Slam title.

At the 2013 US Open, she beat Anabel Medina Garrigues in the first round and then lost to the 23rd seed Jamie Hampton in two sets. Mladenovic partnered up with Daniel Nestor to reach the semifinals of the mixed doubles, where they were defeated by the seventh-seeded team of Max Mirnyi and Andrea Hlaváčková in a close three-setter.

2014: Australian Open mixed doubles champion 
Mladenovic started 2014 off strong, capturing her second mixed-doubles title at the Australian Open partnering again with Nestor. At the Open GdF Suez, she defeated Australian Open quarterfinalist Simona Halep in the first round. Partnering Daniel Nestor she won her second Major title in the mixed doubles event.

At Roland Garros, she upset Li Na (world No. 2 and 2011 champion) in the first round, her first top-5 win. She continued her strong performance with a three-set win over Alison Riske in the second round. In the round of 32, she was beaten by eventual semifinalist Andrea Petkovic.
Mladenovic opened her grass-court season in Birmingham, but lost her opening match to Shahar Pe'er. She then competed in 's-Hertogenbosch qualifying, managing to win a round but ultimately falling to CoCo Vandeweghe, who would go on to qualify and win the entire tournament. At Wimbledon, she drew Zarina Diyas in the first round, but fell to the Kazakh in a rain delayed straight-set encounter. In the doubles draw, Mladenovic partnered Tímea Babos, and reached their first Grand Slam women's doubles final, ultimately losing to Sara Errani and Roberta Vinci in straight sets. She then stunned at the İstanbul Cup the third seed Klára Koukalová, but lost in the semifinals to No. 1 seed Caroline Wozniacki. Her strong run returned her to the top 100, at No. 81. At Baku, she lost in quarterfinals, losing to Francesca Schiavone in a rematch of the İstanbul Cup quarterfinals. She next competed at the Washington Open, where she stunned top seeded Lucie Šafářová, before defeating qualifier Taylor Townsend. She lost to Kurumi Nara in the quarterfinals. Mladenovic lost in the final round of qualifying to Yanina Wickmayer in Montréal, and also the first round of qualifying in Cincinnati. She played doubles in Montréal, losing in the first round with partner Tímea Babos.

2015: Top 30 and first major quarterfinal in singles

Mladenovic began the year losing in the second round of the Australian Open to Bethanie Mattek-Sands. She, along with Daniel Nestor, reached the final of the mixed-doubles event. She lost in the second round of the Diamond Games in Antwerp to Lucie Šafářová.

She reached the semifinals of Marrakesh, losing to her doubles partner Tímea Babos. She reached the singles final in Strasbourg, her first ever WTA Tour singles final, where she lost to Samantha Stosur. Her strong showing at both tournaments ensured her entry into the top 50 of the WTA singles rankings.

At the French Open, Mladenovic once again stunned a top-10 player in her opening match by defeating world No. 6, Eugenie Bouchard. She advanced to the third round with a victory over Danka Kovinić but lost to Alison Van Uytvanck in straight sets while fighting for a spot in the last 16.

At the Rosmalen Open, Mladenovic lost to eventual finalist and good friend Belinda Bencic, despite having match point opportunities. At the Birmingham Classic, she beat Bouchard again 3–6, 6–4, 6–0, and then once again stunned a top-10 player by defeating world No. 3, Simona Halep, 2–6, 6–0, 7–6.

At the US Open, she reached the quarterfinals with wins over Svetlana Kuznetsova, Bojana Jovanovski, lucky loser Daria Kasatkina and Ekaterina Makarova before losing to eventual finalist Roberta Vinci in the quarterfinals, and entered the top 30 of the WTA singles rankings for the first time in her career.

2016: French Open doubles champion

In May, Mladenovic reached the singles semifinals of the Internationaux de Strasbourg, but lost to Mirjana Lučić-Baroni.

At the French Open, Mladenovic won her first round match against the 2010 French Open singles champion Francesca Schiavone, and defeated her former doubles partner Tímea Babos in the second. She lost in the third round to world No. 1 and defending champion, Serena Williams, in two sets, after having a set point at 9–8 in the tiebreak. Mladenovic won the doubles event partnering Caroline Garcia, beating Ekaterina Makarova and Elena Vesnina in the final. It was the first Grand Slam women's doubles crown for Garcia and Mladenovic, and they became the first all-French pair to win the French Open women's doubles title since Gail Chanfreau and Françoise Dürr in 1971.

In June, Mladenovic reached her second career singles final at the Rosmalen Grass Court Championships in which she lost to CoCo Vandeweghe.

Mladenovic participated in the singles, doubles and mixed-doubles events of the London Olympics. In the women's singles, she was defeated in the second round by Madison Keys. In the women's doubles event, Mladenovic partnered Caroline Garcia, with whom she had won the French Open in June. Despite being seeded No. 2, they lost in the first round. Mladenovic (she was paired with Pierre-Hugues Herbert and they were seeded No. 2) also lost in the first round of the mixed-doubles event.

At the US Open singles event, Mladenovic cleared the first round before falling to Anastasia Pavlyuchenkova in the second. In doubles, Mladenovic (partnered with Garcia) reached the final, where the French team was defeated by Bethanie Mattek-Sands and Lucie Šafářová. This allowed Garcia and Mladenovic to qualify for the WTA Finals, becoming the second doubles team yet to do so.

Mladenovic moved on to the Asian swing, starting at the Korea Open. Seeded No. 4, Mladenovic had a surprise loss against Sara Sorribes Tormo, the 139th player in the world. Next, at the Wuhan Open, she faced world No. 1, Angelique Kerber in the second round. Kerber won the match, although Mladenovic captured the first set. In doubles, Mladenovic partnered with Garcia again, and the team was seeded No. 1. Despite this, the Frenchwomen lost their opening match against Christina McHale and Peng Shuai. In Beijing, Mladenovic defeated Jelena Janković in the first round, before facing eighth seed Madison Keys. Keys won in straight sets. In doubles, Mladenovic and Garcia, once again the No. 1 seeds, made their way to the final, in which they faced Mattek-Sands and Šafářová, in a rematch of the US Open final a few weeks earlier. Mattek-Sands and Šafářová won the final in two sets.

Mladenovic had success in singles at the Hong Kong Open. An unseeded player, she reached the semifinals after defeating doubles rival Mattek-Sands in the quarterfinals. She passed No. 8 seed Daria Gavrilova to reach her second singles final of the year. She was defeated by former No. 1, Wozniacki, in the final.

Shortly before heading into the WTA Finals, Mladenovic and Caroline Garcia received the WTA Award for Best Doubles Team of the Year. During the WTA Finals, the Frenchwomen defeated Julia Görges and Karolína Plíšková in the quarterfinals, but fell to Mattek-Sands and Šafářová in the semifinals.

During the 2016 Fed Cup final between France and the Czech Republic, Mladenovic lost the first rubber narrowly against Karolína Plíšková 3–6, 6–4, 14–16, a match that lasted 3 hours 48 minutes. She later played doubles with Garcia in the fifth and decisive rubber against Plíšková and Barbora Strýcová, which they lost 5–7, 5–7, enabling the Czechs to win the Fed Cup for the fifth time in six years.

In December, Garcia and Mladenovic were named the doubles ITF World Champions of 2016. Mladenovic ended the year ranked No. 42 in singles, and tied No. 2 in doubles (with Garcia).

2017: First WTA Tour singles title and top-10 singles debut

Mladenovic began the year by playing at the Hopman Cup alongside Richard Gasquet. The pair won their first tie against Germany's Andrea Petkovic and Alexander Zverev 2–1 (Mladenovic lost her singles match against Petkovic), and their second tie against Great Britain's Daniel Evans and Heather Watson 3–0. In France's third Group A tie against Switzerland which would decide which team would enter the final, Mladenovic (following Gasquet's defeat to Roger Federer) defeated Belinda Bencic and triumphed with Gasquet against the Swiss pair in mixed doubles, winning the tie 2–1. In the final, Mladenovic and Gasquet faced Americans Jack Sock and CoCo Vandeweghe. Although Gasquet won his singles match and Mladenovic lost hers, the French duo won the decisive mixed-doubles match, meaning that France were the 2017 Hopman Cup champions.

Mladenovic had a disappointing run at the Australian Open in singles, losing in the first round to Ana Konjuh. However, in doubles, Mladenovic, reuniting with partner Caroline Garcia, reached the semifinals of the event, where they lost to Andrea Hlaváčková and Peng Shuai.

At the St. Petersburg Ladies' Trophy, Mladenovic won her first round match against Elise Mertens before upsetting reigning Australian Open finalist Venus Williams to reach the quarterfinals. She continued her fabulous form against No. 6 seed and defending champion Roberta Vinci, defeating the Italian veteran in straight sets. In the semifinals, the Frenchwoman defeated rising player Natalia Vikhlyantseva to reach the first WTA Premier singles final of her career. In a tense final, Mladenovic defeated Yulia Putintseva, 6–2, 6–7, 6–4 to win the first WTA Tour singles title of her career. Mladenovic became the first Frenchwoman to win a WTA Premier singles title since Marion Bartoli in June 2011. In addition, Mladenovic competed in doubles with Daria Gavrilova; this was the first time Mladenovic played with someone other than Garcia in over a year. The pair were defeated in the semifinals.

In the Fed Cup World Group quarterfinals against Switzerland, Mladenovic won her first singles match against Belinda Bencic. However, she then lost to Timea Bacsinszky in her next singles match. France lost the tie 1–4, resulting in France needing to win the Fed Cup World Group Play-off tie to earn the right to play in the 2018 World Group.

At Dubai, at the first Premier-5 event of the season, Mladenovic defeated Kateřina Siniaková in the first round before defeating world No. 3, Karolína Plíšková, 6–2, 6–4 in the second round. She then lost to Wang Qiang in the third round. Mladenovic's good form continued at the Mexican Open, where she stormed past Varvara Lepchenko before winning a marathon match against Heather Watson to reach the quarterfinals, in which she defeated Kirsten Flipkens. Mladenovic then won her semifinal encounter with Christina McHale, reaching her second WTA Tour singles final of 2017. Though she did end up losing to Lesia Tsurenko in the final, her success in February allowed Mladenovic to reach a career-high WTA singles ranking of No. 26. Moreover, Mladenovic was nominated for February's WTA Shot of the Month, WTA Breakthrough Player of the Month, and WTA Player of the Month (winning the WTA Breakthrough Player of the Month).

Prior to the Indian Wells Open, Mladenovic announced that her doubles partnership with Caroline Garcia would end because Garcia wanted to focus on her singles career. Mladenovic instead competed with Svetlana Kuznetsova in the doubles draw of Indian Wells. Meanwhile, in singles, the Frenchwoman received a bye into the second round, being seeded No. 28. She had a strong opening, defeating Annika Beck of Germany. In the third round, Mladenovic continued her newfound success by defeating world No. 4, Simona Halep, in straight sets, setting up an encounter with Lauren Davis, which she won in straight sets as well, reaching her first career WTA Premier Mandatory singles quarterfinals. Mladenovic continued to shine, defeating Caroline Wozniacki 3–6, 7–6, 6–2 (Mladenovic had never beaten Wozniacki in three previous encounters) before losing to eventual champion Elena Vesnina in the semifinals. Her good performance at the BNP Paribas Open enabled Mladenovic to attain a career-high singles ranking of No. 18, and she became the No. 1 Frenchwoman once again (passing Caroline Garcia). She also had success with Kuznetsova in the doubles, knocking out the fifth-seeded pair of Andrea Hlaváčková and Peng Shuai in the second round before losing in the quarterfinals.

At the Miami Open, Mladenovic lost her opening singles match to the Romanian qualifier Patricia Maria Țig. In doubles, playing again with Kuznetsova, she faced Hlaváčková and Peng in the quarterfinals, in a repeat of their Indian Wells encounter. This time, Hlaváčková and Peng won the match, and Mladenovic missed the opportunity to become doubles world No. 1.

At the Porsche Tennis Grand Prix, Mladenovic defeated top-seed Angelique Kerber in the second round and three-time champion Maria Sharapova (who was playing her first WTA tournament after serving a 15-month suspension for failing a drug test) in the semifinals to reach her third WTA Tour singles final of the year. Against German wildcard Laura Siegemund (who was playing in her hometown), Mladenovic led 4–1 in the final set tiebreak but ended losing the match 1–6, 6–2, 6–7.

Mladenovic, seeded No. 14, reached her first career Premier Mandatory singles final at the Madrid Open by defeating her doubles partner Svetlana Kuznetsova in the semifinals. In the final, she lost to third seeded Simona Halep in three sets. On 15 May (the day after the Madrid final), Mladenovic reached a career-high WTA singles ranking of No. 14. Seeded No. 13, Mladenovic lost her singles first round match against Julia Görges at the Italian Open.

At her home Grand Slam, the French Open, she won her first-round match in a tight three sets against American Jennifer Brady. In the second round, she faced the 2012 finalist Sara Errani whom she defeated in straight sets. In the third round, she had a close match against Shelby Rogers and advanced to the fourth round, her best showing at this tournament. She defeated the defending champion Garbiñe Muguruza in three sets to advance to her second quarterfinal of a Grand Slam tournament in her career. She then lost to Timea Bacsinszky.

Her form declined in the second half of the season. At Wimbledon, she lost in the singles second round, sustaining a right knee injury in the process. Over the next four months, she struggled to get back into shape again and suffered a loss of confidence. This caused Mladenovic to lose all twelve of her remaining singles matches of 2018 after winning her first-round singles match at the Washington Open (she won only two sets in those 12 singles matches) at various hard-court tournaments (including the US Open) in North America, Asia and Europe. Arguably her worst moment came at the Pan Pacific Open, where she suffered a double bagel defeat in the first round against Wang Qiang.

However, due to a consistent first half of the season which saw Mladenovic being constantly in the top eight of the Race to Singapore, she eventually broke into the top ten of the singles rankings for the first time in her career (at No. 10) on 23 October 2017, at the start of the WTA Finals. And because of big results in that half of the season, Mladenovic called the season "still the best of my career", when opening about her singles slump in the second half of the year.

2018: Australian Open doubles title

Mladenovic started her season at the Brisbane International, where she lost in the first round to the eventual singles finalist Aliaksandra Sasnovich in three sets. In her next tournament, the Sydney International, she retired in second set of her first-round match against the Australian wildcard Ellen Perez due to heat stress. At the Australian Open, Mladenovic's poor form in singles continued, losing her first round match in straight sets to world No. 104, Ana Bogdan from Romania, extending her losing streak in singles to 15 consecutive matches. Opening up about the loss, Mladenovic stated that it was not about injury anymore, that it was just a bad day and that it could not continue like that. Mladenovic turned things around when she won the Australian Open women's doubles with Tímea Babos, thus winning her second career Grand Slam women's doubles title.

Mladenovic next played in St. Petersburg as the defending singles champion. After receiving a first-round bye, Mladenovic showed signs of her top form and confidence which enabled her to reach four WTA singles finals in the first half of 2017 by defeating former top-5 player and 2016 WTA Finals champion Dominika Cibulková in the second round, ending her 15-match losing streak in singles. She then followed up her second round win by beating Kateřina Siniaková in the quarterfinals and Daria Kasatkina in the semifinals (who had beaten the 2018 Australian Open champion Caroline Wozniacki previously), to advance to her first WTA Tour singles final since the Madrid Open the previous year. In the final she lost to Petra Kvitova in straight sets. Mladenovic won both her singles matches and her doubles match in the Fed Cup World Group quarterfinal tie against Belgium on February 10–11. She lost her singles second round and first round matches in Doha and Dubai, respectively.

Mladenovic reached her second WTA singles quarterfinal of the year in Acapulco, where she lost to the defending champion Lesia Tsurenko. In Indian Wells, Mladenovic defeated Samantha Stosur in the second round before losing in the third round to Wang Qiang, who improved their head-to-head to 3–0. In the Indian Wells doubles event, Mladenovic partnered Babos and they lost in the semifinals to Ekaterina Makarova and Elena Vesnina. Mladenovic lost her opening singles match in Miami to Petra Martić. She lost her first-round matches in three (Lugano, Stuttgart and Rome) of her next five tournaments, winning a total of three singles matches in the other two (Fed Cup World Group semifinals and Madrid).

At the French Open, the 29th seeded Mladenovic lost in the singles first round to Andrea Petkovic. Mladenovic and Babos were the women's doubles top-seeds at that tournament, losing in the quarterfinals to the unseeded Japanese pair of Eri Hozumi and Makoto Ninomiya. On 11 June, Mladenovic's WTA singles ranking fell to world No. 54, compared to No. 31 two weeks earlier. She played her first grass-court tournament of the year in Birmingham, where she lost in the singles second round to the unseeded Magdaléna Rybáriková. Mladenovic and Babos won the Birmingham doubles title, defeating Elise Mertens and Demi Schuurs in the final. The following week in Eastbourne, the again unseeded Mladenovic lost in the singles second round to the No. 8 seed Ashleigh Barty. The unseeded Mladenovic was defeated in the third round of Wimbledon by Serena Williams in two sets, and the top-seeded pair of Mladenovic and Babos were defeated in the women's doubles quarterfinals.

Mladenovic lost her opening singles matches (both in straight sets) in her next two tournaments, to Tímea Babos and Victoria Azarenka in San Jose and Montreal respectively. Mladenovic registered her first top-10 singles win of 2018 in Cincinnati when Julia Görges retired in the first round because of a calf injury.

2019: French Open doubles title and world No. 1 ranking in doubles

Mladenovic and Babos were the defending champions at the Australian Open where they lost in the final to Samantha Stosur and Zhang Shuai.

In Dubai, Mladenovic defeated world No. 1, Naomi Osaka, in the second round. She then lost her next match to Carla Suárez Navarro. In April, Mladenovic played for France in the Fed Cup semifinals. She lost her match against Simona Halep. Then, in the deciding doubles rubber, Mladenovic and Garcia defeated Halep and Niculescu.

Mladenovic and Babos made the final of the French Open and in the process, Mladenovic became the number-one doubles player in the world. In the final, they defeated Duan Yingying and Zheng Saisai and won their third Grand Slam title.

Mladenovic reached the second round of the Wimbledon singles, but lost to Petra Kvitová. At the US Open, she won her first-round match against three-time Grand Slam champion and 14th seed, Angelique Kerber.

In the 2019 Fed Cup final against Australia, Mladenovic was essential in France winning their first title since 2003, winning all three of her rubbers. First, she defeated Ajla Tomljanović 6–1, 6–1, and then upset world No. 1, Ashleigh Barty, in three sets. Finally, Mladenovic and Garcia defeated Barty and Stosur in the decisive doubles rubber, 6–4, 6–3.

2020–2021: Two major titles, back to world No. 1 ranking in doubles
Mladenovic won two more Grand Slam doubles titles with Babos, at the 2020 Australian Open and the 2020 French Open, where they were the defending champions.

At the 2021 Australian Open, Mladenovic reached the third round in singles only for the second time at this major.
She reached the final of the Italian Open, partnering with Czech player Markéta Vondroušová, defeating another Czech top-ten duo, second seeds Krejčíková/Siniaková, in the quarterfinals and multiple Grand Slam doubles winner and local favorite, Sara Errani and her partner Irina Begu, in the semifinals. With this successful run, Mladenovic regained her No. 1 doubles ranking. At the same tournament, she reached the second round in singles as a lucky loser defeating top-20 ranked Belinda Bencic to take revenge over her loss at the Madrid Open. She ended her 2021 season in early October citing physical and mental struggles.

2022: Australian Open mixed doubles and fourth French Open titles
Mladenovic, partnering Ivan Dodig, won the mixed doubles event at the Australian Open. It was her second career mixed-doubles title at this major having been crowned champion in 2014 with Daniel Nestor, and her eighth Grand Slam title overall.

At the French Open, she reached the final as a wildcard pair with compatriot Caroline Garcia, and won her fourth French Open title defeating Jessica Pegula and Coco Gauff.
She teamed up with Katerina Siniakova at the 2022 Jasmin Open to win her 28th doubles title in October 2022.

Playing style
Mladenovic employs an all-court playing style, using variety along with her baseline play to win points. Her forehand is her strongest wing, and she is capable of hitting this shot both flat, and with topspin. Her backhand is also a solid shot, and she is capable of hitting her two-hander consistently and can hit backhand winners frequently; she does tend to utilise her sliced backhand more frequently to change the pace of the rally. However, her second serve is much weaker, and she can serve many double faults in a match; during her first round loss to Ekaterina Alexandrova at 2020 Palermo, Mladenovic served 20 double faults. Her doubles success in recent years has allowed her to develop a strong net game; she has begun to approach the net to finish points in singles more frequently due to her increased confidence. She uses her volleys, along with her backhand slice and drop shots, to create a lot of variety in her game. Her movement around the court is very good, considering her height and her footwork, but this can be exposed as a weakness when she needs to recover. Mladenovic's greatest weakness is her fragile mentality, as she finds it difficult to cope with pressure, committing myriad unforced errors, and can lose matches from winning positions – in her second round match at the 2020 US Open, she was leading by 6–1, 5–1 against Varvara Gracheva, holding four match points, before losing in three sets.

Endorsements
Mladenovic wears Adidas clothing and uses Wilson rackets, specifically endorsing the Wilson Ultra range of racquets.

Career statistics

Grand Slam performance timelines

Singles

Doubles

Notes

Mixed doubles

Grand Slam finals

Doubles: 10 (6 titles, 4 runner-ups)

Mixed doubles: 5 (3 titles, 2 runner-ups)

References

External links

 
 
 

1993 births
Living people
French female tennis players
Australian Open (tennis) champions
French Open champions
Wimbledon champions
French Open junior champions
Grand Slam (tennis) champions in women's doubles
Grand Slam (tennis) champions in mixed doubles
Grand Slam (tennis) champions in girls' singles
Tennis players at the 2012 Summer Olympics
Tennis players at the 2016 Summer Olympics
Olympic tennis players of France
Hopman Cup competitors
Sportspeople from Nord (French department)
People from Saint-Pol-sur-Mer
Serb diaspora sportspeople
French people of Serbian descent
French people of Bosnia and Herzegovina descent
French people of Kosovan descent
French expatriate sportspeople in Switzerland
French expatriate sportspeople in the United Arab Emirates
Tennis players at the 2020 Summer Olympics
WTA number 1 ranked doubles tennis players
ITF World Champions